Martí Márquez Román (born 9 February 1996) is a Spanish cyclist, who currently rides for UCI ProTeam .

Major results
2019
 1st Overall Tour of Galicia
1st Stage 1 (TTT)
 3rd Overall 
1st Stage 1 (TTT)
2020
 2nd Overall Belgrade Banjaluka
 8th Overall Tour de Serbie
2021 
 4th Overall Tour de la Mirabelle

References

External links

1996 births
Living people
Spanish male cyclists
Cyclists from Catalonia
People from Vallès Oriental
Sportspeople from the Province of Barcelona
21st-century Spanish people